Lost Gay Novels is a 2003 reference guide written by Anthony Slide that provides commentary on 50 works of gay literature published between 1900 and 1950 that Slide found to be not well-known by late 20th and early 21st-century audiences.

Summary 
Lost Gay Novels provides plot summaries and reviews of 50 novels, organized alphabetically by the authors' last names. The book does not comprehensively cover gay literature from the time period, nor was it designed to be a recommended reading list, but rather covers books with different outlooks on homosexuality and gay issues and the context of their times. Most of the novels included are American, though a few are from Europe. The book also provides a discussion on the characters, and presents authors who are not normally associated with homosexuality.

Importance 
Lost Gay Novels is notable for documenting the gay literature subculture that was active prior to the Stonewall riots. The novels discussed in the book have historically been both ignored by researchers and overshadowed by the history of gay pulp fiction and erotica. Slide mentions that in the 1940s and 1950s, gay literature was published and given publicity, likely due to gay editors leveraging their influence in the publishing world. Widespread realization that this "Homintern" was happening was partly the influence for homosexual panic.

This book inspired a collection that is now in the Cushing Library at Texas A&M University.

See also
 List of gay novels prior to the Stonewall riots

References

Further reading

External links 
 Lost Gay Novels at the Internet Archive
 Lost Gay Novels cover gallery
 Lost Gay Novels reading list

Gay fiction
2003 non-fiction books